Geraldine is the feminine form of the first name Gerald. Notable people with the name include:

 Geraldine Aves (1898–1986), British civil servant
 Geraldine Brannigan (born 1956), Irish singer
 Geraldine Chaplin (born 1944), American actress
 Geraldine Connor (1952–2011), British ethnomusicologist, theatre director, composer and performer
 Geraldine L. Daniels (1933–2012), New York politician
 Geraldine Farrar (1882–1967), American opera soprano
 Geraldine Ferraro (1935–2011), United States congresswoman and 1984 Vice Presidential candidate 
 Geraldine Fitzgerald (1913–2005), Irish actress
 Geri Halliwell (born 1972), former Spice Girl 
 Geraldine James (born 1950), English actress
 Géraldine Martineau (born 1988), French actress
 Geraldine McCaughrean (born 1951), British author
 Geraldine McEwan (1932–2015), English actress 
 Geraldine Page (1924–1987), American actress
 Geraldine Roman (born 1967), Filipino journalist and politician
 Geraldine Somerville (born 1967), Irish actress
 Geraldine Viswanathan (born 1995), Australian actress

See also
Geraldine (disambiguation)

References

Feminine given names